Life in Pictures was a post-hardcore and metalcore band from Prescott, Arizona that formed in 2000. The band released an EP titled Songs From the Sawmill in 2003 on Limekiln Records, and later a full-length record titled By the Sign of the Spyglass in 2005 on Clockwork Recordings. As of early 2006 the band has stated that they are inactive and the members are working on other projects. Guitarist Addison Matthew, bassist Pat Callaway, drummer Dustin Hanna and vocalist Hank Hampton are currently in Hour Of The Wolf.

Heavy metal musical groups from Arizona
Metalcore musical groups from Arizona
Prescott, Arizona